Michal Biran (born 28 June 1978) is an Israeli politician. A member of the Labor Party, she was placed thirteenth on the party's list for the 2013 Knesset elections. She served in Knesset from 2013 to 2019, in the 19th and 20th Knessets.

A resident of Tel Aviv, Biran had worked as an assistant to Labor Party leader Shelly Yachimovich. At the time of her election to the Knesset Biran was working as a lecturer at Tel Aviv University, where she was also studying for a doctorate in political science.

In 2020 she started the Stork initiative to assist people in planning joint parenthood arrangements.

References

External links

1978 births
Living people
Israeli Jews
Israeli Labor Party politicians
Israeli political scientists
Women members of the Knesset
Jewish Israeli politicians
Members of the 19th Knesset (2013–2015)
Members of the 20th Knesset (2015–2019)
People from Hod HaSharon
Tel Aviv University alumni
Academic staff of Tel Aviv University
Zionist Union politicians
21st-century Israeli women politicians
Women political scientists